Roy Kaia (born 10 October 1991) is a Zimbabwean cricketer. He plays first-class cricket for Mountaineers. He made his international debut for the Zimbabwe cricket team in May 2015.

Domestic career
Kaia was part of the 2010 Zimbabwe U19 team that lost to the South Africa U19 team. He took 4 wickets for 49. He was also in the losing side against the same side a few months later in 2011 scoring 60 not out off 56 balls in a T20 match. Kaia played first-class cricket for Southern Rocks and is currently part of Mountaineers team.

He has the most Pro50 Championship List A runs in the season leading the second-placed player by more than 100 runs with an average score of 76.40 in nine games, also taking 6 wickets at an economy of 4.79.

In December 2020, he was selected to play for the Southern Rocks in the 2020–21 Logan Cup.

International career
The performance earned him a national selection when Zimbabwe toured Pakistan in May 2015. He made his One Day International debut for Zimbabwe against Pakistan in Lahore on May 31, 2015 where he did not get to bowl or bat, as the match ended in no result. In April 2021, he was named in Zimbabwe's Test squad, for the series against Pakistan. He made his Test debut for Zimbabwe, against Pakistan, on 29 April 2021. However, in July 2021, following the one-off Test against Bangladesh, Kaia was reported for a suspect bowling action. The following month, his bowling action was ruled to be illegal, and Kaia was suspended from bowling in international matches.

References

External links
 

1991 births
Living people
Zimbabwean cricketers
Zimbabwe Test cricketers
Zimbabwe One Day International cricketers
Southern Rocks cricketers
Centrals cricketers
Mountaineers cricketers
Sportspeople from Mashonaland West Province